Necdet Tosun (August 3, 1926 – May 10, 1975) was a Turkish actor and film producer.

Biography
Born in Burhaniye, Tosun started out in life working in the hospitality industry. His appearance attracted a film crew that arrived in Burhaniye. Since then, Tosun made his mark in the black and white period in Turkish cinema and starred in over 400 films during his lifetime.

At the time of his career, Tosun won the respect and the sympathy of his audience for his optimistic, portly appearance. His sons would later follow in his footsteps.

Personal life
In 1960, Tosun married Sevim Tosun. From this marriage, he was the father of the actors Erdal and Gürdal Tosun.

Death
In 1975, Tosun was involved in a car crash in Germany while on business. He was later brought back to Istanbul for treatment but he succumbed to his injuries on May 10 and was buried at Zincirlikuyu Cemetery. His sons would later be buried alongside him.

Filmography

Cinema
Watchmen of Dawn (1963)

References

External links

1926 births
1975 deaths
People from Burhaniye
Turkish male film actors
Turkish male stage actors
Turkish film producers
20th-century Turkish male actors
Road incident deaths in Turkey
Burials at Zincirlikuyu Cemetery